1 is the debut studio album by Swedish singer Zara Larsson. The album was released on 1 October 2014 by TEN Music Group and Universal Music Group. The album is certified platinum in Sweden and gold in Denmark, for selling 40,000 and 10,000 units in the countries, respectively. The album is only available in Scandinavian countries.

Singles 
 "Bad Boys" was released as the lead single on 13 October 2013. It reached number 33 in Denmark and number 27 in Sweden.
 "Carry You Home" was released as the second single on 12 May 2014. It reached the top five in Sweden, peaking at number three. It additionally charted in Czech Republic and Denmark.
 "Rooftop" was released as the third single on 15 September 2014. It reached number six in Sweden.
 "Weak Heart" was released as the fourth and final single on 12 January 2015. It reached number 53 in Sweden, being the lowest-charting single from the album.

Critical reception 
Kyle Copier of A Music Blog, Yea? gave 1 a very positive review, stating "Where her colleagues, even older, more experienced ones, usually lack emotion, the change in tone from confident ex-girlfriend to shaken ex-lover in “She’s Not Me” from Part 1 to Part 2 is chilling." Copier praised her vocals for being beyond her age. Copier finished his review by writing: "For now, she’s an exciting, young, impressive artist with a ceiling that has yet to be seen and a killer debut- I’m sure that will do. You can bet I’m going to do a much better job keeping tabs on Zara Larsson from here on out." Press Play OK gave 1 a more mixed review, writing: "Larsson’s songs unfortunately feel bereft of any substance based on life experience. Skipping A Beat takes a riff on that similar Olly Murs song, while Rooftop is simplistic."

Commercial performance 
1 has charted in three countries, it reached number 33 in Denmark, number 28 in Norway, and topped the Swedish Albums Chart.

Track listing

Notes
 signifies a vocal producer

Personnel
Credits adapted from the liner notes of 1.

Performers and musicians

Zara Larsson – vocals
Mel & Mus – all instruments 

Production

A.C. – production 
Nicki Adamsson – vocals engineering 
Erik Arvinder – strings recording , strings arrangement 
Billboard – production 
Adel Dahdal – mixing 
Björn Engelmann – mastering 
Kevin Figs – production 
Chris Gehringer – mastering 
Serban Ghenea – mixing 
Grizzly – production , mixing 
Ola Håkansson – executive production
Robert Habolin – production , vocal production , vocal recording , mixing , recording 
John Hanes – engineered for mix
Simon Hassle – production 
Benjamin Johansson – production 
JUNGLE – production , mixing 
Claude Kelly – production 
Zara Larsson – executive production
Elof Loelv – production , mixing 
Mack – executive production, production , vocal production , vocal recording 
Erik Madrid – mixing 
Mel & Mus – production 
Naiv – production , mixing 
Nicki & Hampus – mixing 
Colin Norman – production 
O.C. – production 
Daniela Rivera – additional engineering 
Nick Ruth – production 
Phil Tan – mixing 
Tommy Tysper – production 
Vincent Vu – mixing assistant 

Design and management

Linnea Aarflot – art direction
Atena Banisaid – product management
Fredrik Etoall – photography
Mack – A&R
Emma Svensson – photography

Charts

Weekly charts

Year-end charts

Certifications

Release history

References

2014 debut albums
Zara Larsson albums
TEN Music Group albums
Universal Music Group albums